Major William Adolphus Chaffey (18 February 1915 – 4 March 1987) was an Australian farmer, distinguished soldier and long serving member of the Parliament of New South Wales.

Chaffey represented the electoral district of Tamworth from 1940 to 1973. He also served as the New South Wales Minister for Agriculture from 1965 to 1968. Chaffey succeeded his father, Frank in parliament after the latter's death, and together they served a combined fifty-nine years and nine months in the New South Wales parliament representing the New England region of New South Wales.

Biography
William Adolphus Chaffey was born in Tamworth, New South Wales on 18 February 1915 to Frank Augustus Chaffey, himself a member of the New South Wales Legislative Assembly, and Amy McIlveen. He was educated at Tamworth Public School, The King's School, and Hawkesbury Agricultural College. He subsequently returned to the Tamworth district and began farming there before his election to parliament.

On 16 December 1941, in his first term in parliament, he joined the Australian Imperial Force. He served in the 2/5th Independent Company, and was twice mentioned in despatches, as well as winning the United States' Bronze Star Medal. In 1948, he became a member of the Australian Citizens Military Forces, remaining there until 1961.

On 29 January 1946 William Adolphus Chaffey married Patricia Egerton-Warburton at Mount Barker. They would eventually have two daughters and one son.

In politics
On the death of his father, Frank Augustus Chaffey, William won his father's seat at the 1940 Tamworth by-election, as a member of the United Australia Party. In 1941, he was challenged for UAP preselection; however, like his father, who had never submitted to a party preselection vote, he refused to submit to an internal preselection contest. He instead contested and won the seat against his challenger as an independent. He was then re-elected unopposed in 1944 as an independent due to his active military service, having enlisted in 1941. He remained an independent until he formally joined the Country Party on 4 December 1945.

Chaffey was the deputy leader of the Country Party from 1959 to 1968. He was Minister for Agriculture in the first term of the Askin government from 1965 to 1968. He was deposed as deputy leader by Davis Hughes in 1968 and dropped from the ministry in the aftermath, despite the support of the Primary Producers' Union. Always known for being independently minded, Chaffey was reported to have become increasingly estranged from his Country Party colleagues after his 1968 ouster. On 21 September 1972, he resigned from the Country Party when the government of which it was part refused to discuss a motion he had put forward concerning parliamentary security. He continued as an independent until his retirement at the 1973 New South Wales state election.

Chaffey was an Honorary Vice President of the Royal Agricultural Society of New South Wales. Chaffey died in Tamworth on 3 March 1987 and was cremated. Chaffey Dam, a large freshwater dam on the Peel River north of Tamworth, New South Wales is named after both Bill and his father Frank. He was a Freemason.

See also
New South Wales Legislative Assembly

References

 

1915 births
1987 deaths
Military personnel from New South Wales
Members of the New South Wales Legislative Assembly
National Party of Australia members of the Parliament of New South Wales
Independent members of the Parliament of New South Wales
United Australia Party members of the Parliament of New South Wales
20th-century Australian politicians
Australian Army personnel of World War II
Australian Army officers
Z Special Unit personnel